Boat shoes (also known as deck shoes) are typically canvas or leather with non-marking rubber soles designed for use on a boat. A siping pattern is cut into the soles to provide grip on a wet deck; the leather construction, along with the application of oil, is designed to repel water; and the stitching is highly durable. Boat shoes are traditionally worn without socks.

History 
Modern boat shoes were invented in 1935 by American Paul A. Sperry of New Haven, Connecticut after noticing his dog's ability to run easily over ice without slipping. Using a knife, he cut siping into his shoes' soles, inspiring a shoe perfect for boating and a company called Sperry Top-Sider. Sperry Top-Siders are still a popular brand of boat shoe today, among many others, including Boatman Shoes, Portside, Sebago and Timberland. Boat shoes are worn by both women and men.

Boat shoes are used by sailors, as the name suggests; however, since the 1970s they have become casual  footwear in coastal areas of the Netherlands, the United States, Canada, Argentina, Australia, China, France, Italy, Portugal, Spain, Germany and the United Kingdom. Some boat shoes today have traditional white, non-marking soles, though many others today have dark non-marking soles. They usually have a moc-toe (like a moccasin) construction. They are usually seen as somewhat of a status symbol (boat shoes suggest  ownership of a boat with a deck large enough to walk around on).

In the 1980s through to the early 1990s, they became a fashion trend and returned in 2007–2008 and the 2010s. They were worn with every day and dress wear by boys, girls, men and women. The fashion was widely popular from upper elementary to college age in many countries. They are sometimes worn with socks, especially low-cut, ankle socks or crew socks in white or bright neon and pastel colors. In the 80s to early 90s they were worn with slouch socks, often with tight rolled/French rolled jeans to show off the slouch socks. Sebago, Sperry Top-Siders and Eastland were the most popular brands then (and have remained so through the 2008 into the 2010s revival). Boat shoes are a common component of the preppy fashion and associated lifestyle. Many schools with uniform requirements allow boat shoes.

References

External links

Shoes
History of fashion
American inventions